Diestothyris is a genus of brachiopods belonging to the family Terebrataliidae.

The species of this genus are found in Northern Pacific Ocean.

Species:

Diestothyris frontalis 
Diestothyris tisimania

References

Brachiopod genera